Gavin Plumley (born 2 March 1981) is a British cultural historian, writer, lecturer and broadcaster.

Life

Born in Dundee, Gavin Plumley was brought up in Wales, before moving to London, and was educated at Keble College, Oxford. He lives in the village of Pembridge in Herefordshire with his husband Alastair Tighe, Head Master of Wells Cathedral School, and their dog Nimrod.

Career

Having graduated in 2002, he worked at the Royal Opera House, Covent Garden and subsequently as a theatrical agent. Gavin Plumley became a freelance writer and broadcaster in October 2011, specialising in the music and culture of Central Europe. He has written a wide range of publications, including Country Life, The Guardian, The Independent on Sunday, Literary Review, The Hudson Review, GQ, Opera, Gramophone and BBC Music Magazine. Gavin Plumley appears frequently on BBC Radio 3, including at The Proms, and on BBC Radio 4.

Gavin Plumley writes regularly for leading opera companies such as the Salzburg Festival, the Vienna State Opera, the Metropolitan Opera, New York, the Lyric Opera of Chicago, La Monnaie, Brussels, Dutch National Opera, Opera North, Scottish Opera, English National Opera, Welsh National Opera and the Royal Opera House and for orchestras and concert halls including Carnegie Hall, The Juilliard School, the BBC Symphony Orchestra, the BBC Philharmonic, the CBSO, the LSO and Wigmore Hall.

As well as his work for The Arts Society, both at home and abroad, he has lectured at numerous art galleries, museums, opera houses and concert halls, including the National Theatre, the National Trust, National Gallery, the British Museum, the Neue Galerie, New York, the Royal Opera House, English National Opera, Garsington, Glyndebourne, Wigmore Hall and Southbank Centre.

His first book, A Home for All Seasons, was published in hardback by Atlantic Books in June 2022. An audiobook appeared in October 2022 and a paperback will be published in May 2023. The book is described as 'a hybrid work of domestic history and European art, of memoir and landscape'.

References

English journalists
Living people
People from Herefordshire
People from Dundee
1981 births
British LGBT writers
LGBT Roman Catholics
Alumni of Keble College, Oxford
Journalists from Dundee